Al-Ansar is a professional basketball club based in the city of Medina in the Al Madinah Province, Saudi Arabia that plays in the Saudi Premier League. They competed in the 2000 and 2010 Arab Club Championships.

Achievements
Saudi Arabia Premier League champion: 2008
Saudi Arabia Prince Faisal bin Fahad Cup winner: 2007, 2009, 2011, 2012, 2013

Notable players
 Mustafa Al Hosawi
 Marzouq Almuwallad
 Kiwi Gardner

See also
Al-Ansar (Saudi Arabia)

References

External links
Team profile at Asia-Basket.com

Basketball teams established in 1965
Basketball teams in Saudi Arabia
Sport in Medina